Hemingbrough is a small village and civil parish in the Selby District of North Yorkshire, England that is located approximately  from Selby and  from Howden on the A63. The village has a 12th-century former collegiate church (Hemingbrough Minster), a Methodist chapel and shops. The village also has a primary school and nursery as well as a playing field for the local children. The surrounding area makes up part of the Humberhead Levels and is flat land mainly used for mixed agriculture. It is thought that from this village came Walter of Hemingbrough, one of Britain's early chroniclers. Writing in the 14th century, he gave us a history beginning with the Norman conquest, now in the British Museum.

Robert de Hemmingburgh, a royal clerk who became Master of the Rolls in Ireland, was born here in the late thirteenth century. Nicholas Bubbewyth, a chancery clerk who became successively, Master of the Rolls, Keeper of the Privy Seal, Lord High Treasurer of England, and Bishop of London, Bishop of Salisbury and Bishop of Bath and Wells, was born in Menthorpe.

In 1989 Caron Keating and Blue Peter visited the village to replace the cockerel on the top of the church spire which had been damaged for several years.

In February 2014, Hemingbrough Parish Council were awarded funds from the Heritage Lottery Fund to help raise awareness of the historical heritage within Hemingbrough Parish to benefit the local community.

History and overview

The toponym is of uncertain origin. The place is mentioned in the Knýtlinga saga, and the name may be the burh of a Viking named Hemingr. Alternative explanations are that it was the burh of the followers of a man called Hema, or the burh by the fish-weir (Old English hemming).

In the Middle Ages the village was in the Ouse and Derwent wapentake of the East Riding of Yorkshire. At that time the village was on the River Ouse, but at some point the river broke through a meander leaving the village some distance from the river. Hemingbrough was a large parish, and included the townships of Barlby, Osgodby, Cliffe with Lund, South Duffield, Brackenholme with Woodhall and Menthorpe with Bowthorpe. All these townships became separate civil parishes in 1866. In 1935 the civil parish of Hemingbrough absorbed the civil parish of Brackenholme with Woodhall.

In 1974 Hemingbrough was transferred from the East Riding to the new county of North Yorkshire.

The village holds a very popular summer fete replete with floats on lorries and tractor trailers. There is a memorial garden which the Archbishop of York Dr John Sentamu visited in April 2016.

St Mary the Virgin Church
The village has a 12th-century church, called St Mary the Virgin, which has served as a Minster to this area until the dissolution of the monasteries. It has a  spire, added in the 15th century, which allows it to dominate the plain. Its importance lies in the woodwork and carvings in the church and it has oldest recorded misericord in the country.

Governance
An electoral ward in the same name exists. This ward includes Cliffe and surrounding areas with a total population taken at the 2011 Census of 4,098.

Notable residents
 Nigel Cumberland - Author, who lived in the village during his schooling years
 Blessed Robert Dalby - English Catholic priest and martyr.
 Jeremiah Smith (Royal Navy officer) (died 1675)

References

External links

Hemingbrough Parish Council website

Civil parishes in North Yorkshire
Selby District
Villages in North Yorkshire